Southern Pacific Railroad's AC-3 class of steam locomotive was the 3rd and last cab forward design based on the 2-8-8-2 wheel arrangement.  All 20 locomotives in this class were rebuilds from MC-6 class locomotives originally built by Baldwin Locomotive Works in 1912 and 1913.  The rebuilds all took place in the late 1920s at Southern Pacific's Sacramento shops.

After the rebuilds, these locomotives were used through World War II. The AC-3ś were used for long freight runs, and during World War II sometimes for passenger/troop cars.  All of this class were scrapped soon after retirement. 

The first to be retired from active service were numbers 4040 and 4045, both on October 21, 1946; the last was number 4032 on August 8, 1949.

References 
 

Baldwin locomotives
Mallet locomotives
AC-03
2-8-8-2 locomotives
Simple articulated locomotives
Steam locomotives of the United States
Scrapped locomotives
Standard gauge locomotives of the United States
Railway locomotives introduced in 1912

Cab forward steam locomotives 
Freight locomotives